Peipei Ping is an academic specializing in cardiac physiology, system biology and data science.

Education 
Peipei Ping received a BS in biomedical engineering at Zhejiang University in 1985, and a PhD in cardiovascular physiology at University of Arizona in 1990, under the direction of Paul C. Johnson. She completed post-doctoral research at University of North Carolina at Chapel Hill (1991-1992) and at University of California San Diego (1992-1994).

Career 

Ping began her academic career as assistant professor at University of Louisville in 1996, and was promoted to associate professor in 2000. She became a full professor in physiology, medicine and bioinformatics when she moved to the David Geffen School of Medicine at University of California, Los Angeles in 2002. She conducts research in proteomics, systems biology and data science, particularly in advancing cardiac physiology. She co-authored the article on Guidelines for experimental models of myocardial ischemia and infarction, which won the American Physiological Society Best Paper for Review Article in 2019.

She is a Fellow of the Cardiovascular Section of the American Physiological Society, a Fellow of the International Society for Heart Research, and a Fellow of the American Heart Association. She was part of the leadership team of the National Institute of Health Big Data to Knowledge Program (BD2K). She was principal investigator of Heart BD2K, one of BD2K Centers of Excellence; and program director of the BD2K Centers Coordinating Center.

Ping serves on the editorial board of Circulation, Clinical Proteomics, and Proteomics, and on the editorial advisory board of Journal of Proteome Research. She served as president of the North American Section of the International Society of Heart Research, and as chair of the Publication Committee and secretary general of the Human Proteome Organization. She is currently serving on the board of directors of U.S. Human Proteome Organization.

Awards 

 2021 U.S. Human Proteome Organization Donald F. Hunt Distinguished Contribution in Proteomics Award
 2018 Human Proteome Organization Clinical & Translational Proteomics Award
 2017 Institute of Cardiovascular Sciences Ken Bowman Research Achievement
 2015 American Physiological Society Robert M. Berne Distinguished Lectureship
 2013 Human Proteome Organization Distinguished Service Award
 2012 American Heart Association Thomas W. Smith Memorial Lecture
 2010 National Institute of Health Method To Extend Research in Time (MERIT) Award NIH-R37–63901
 2000-2001 University of Louisville Provost's Awards for Exemplary Advising

References 

Living people
Proteomics
American women scientists
University of Arizona alumni
University of California, Los Angeles faculty
Zhejiang University alumni
Year of birth missing (living people)